Fresh Pond–Traffic Historic District is a national historic district in Ridgewood, Queens, New York.  It includes 197 contributing buildings built between 1914 and 1921.  They consist mainly of brick two story row houses with one apartment per floor.  They have flat or rounded fronts with cream colored or amber, iron spot brick.

The district includes the following addresses:
Linden Street
61-11 to 61-57
61-12 to 61-64
Gates Avenue
61-09 to 61-59
61-12 to 61-60
64-01 to 64-07
64-02 to 64-18
Palmetto Street
61-11 to 61-55
61-12 to 61-54
64-01 to 64-33
64-02 to 64-42

It was listed on the National Register of Historic Places in 1983.

References

 

Ridgewood, Queens
Historic districts on the National Register of Historic Places in Queens, New York
Historic districts in Queens, New York